Dillon Ruml (born 4 March 1999) is a speedway rider from the United States.

Speedway career 
Ruml was the AMA Best Pairs Speedway National Champion in 2018 and 2019. In 2021, he joined the Plymouth Gladiators for his first season in British speedway, riding in the SGB Championship 2021. In 2022, Ruml signed for the Oxford Cheetahs for the 2022 season. The Cheetahs were returning to action after a 14-year absence from British Speedway. He was named rider of the year for the Cheetahs but was released at the end of the season due to difficulties over the points limit for 2023.

Family
He is the younger brother of fellow Speedway rider Max Ruml.

References 

1999 births
Living people
American speedway riders
Oxford Cheetahs riders
Plymouth Gladiators speedway riders
Sportspeople from Orange, California